The Bulletin of the American Mathematical Society is a quarterly mathematical journal published by the American Mathematical Society.

Scope
It publishes surveys on contemporary research topics, written at a level accessible to non-experts. It also publishes, by invitation only, book reviews and short Mathematical Perspectives articles.

History
It began as the Bulletin of the New York Mathematical Society and underwent a name change when the society became national.  The Bulletin's function has changed over the years; its original function was to serve as a research journal for its members.

Indexing
The Bulletin is indexed in Mathematical Reviews, Science Citation Index, ISI Alerting Services, CompuMath Citation Index, and Current Contents/Physical, Chemical & Earth Sciences.

See also
Journal of the American Mathematical Society
Memoirs of the American Mathematical Society
Notices of the American Mathematical Society
Proceedings of the American Mathematical Society
Transactions of the American Mathematical Society

References

External links
 Journal web site

American Mathematical Society academic journals
Mathematics journals
Quarterly journals
English-language journals